The 2nd Conference of the 6th Season of the Shakey's V-League was held in October 2009 at the Filoil Flying V Arena. Second Conference shall be governed by the FIVB Official Volleyball Rules. The participating teams is the same as the last conference, but without the two Visayan teams.

The Shakey's V-League is an intercollegiate women's volleyball league in the Philippines formed in 2004 by a management group led by former PBA commissioner Jun Bernardino and pizza company Shakey's.

Tournament format
Preliminaries
The eight participating teams will play one round. The six teams with the best win–loss records, after the round, will qualify into the quarter-finals.
In the event of a two-way tie for 6th place, the tie will be resolved by a play-off game.
If three or more teams are tied for 6th place, FIVB Rules shall apply to determine the best two which will play-off to resolve the tie.
Quarter-finals
The six qualified teams will play one round. With the win–loss records of the preliminaries carried over into the quarter-finals, the four teams with the best win–loss records, after the round, will qualify into the semi-finals.
In the event of a two-way tie for 4th place, the tie will be resolved by a play-off game.
If three or more teams are tied for 4th place, FIVB Rules shall apply to determine the best two which will play-off to resolve the tie.
Semi-finals
A best-of-three series will be played between the 1st and 4th placed teams of the quarters.
A best-of-three series will be played between the 2nd and 3rd placed teams of the quarters.
Finals
A best-of-three series will be played between the 2 winners of the semis for the gold.
A best-of-three series will be played between the 2 losers of the semis for the bronze.
If the gold medalist is determined in two games, the series for the bronze medal will also end in two games. If the contenders for the bronze are tied after two games, then FIVB Rules will determine the winner.

Preliminaries

Team standings

Results

Important note: All teams played all of their opponents only once.

Quarterfinals

Team standings

Results

Important note: All teams played all of their opponents only once.

Bracket

Fourth-seed playoff

Semifinals

UST vs. FEU

UST leads series, 1-0

UST wins series, 2-0

San Sebastian vs. Adamson

AdU leads series, 1-0

AdU wins series, 2-0

Finals

Bronze series

FEU leads series, 1-0

FEU wins series, 2-0

Championship series

UST leads series, 1-0

UST wins series, 2-0

Final ranking
Champion - 
1st runner-up - 
2nd runner-up - 
3rd runner-up -

Awards
Best Scorer: Angela Benting (Adamson)
Best Attacker: Giza Yumang (CSB)
Best Blocker: Ma. Paulina Soriano (AdU)
Best Setter: April Linor Jose (FEU)
Best Digger: Stephanie Gabriel (Ateneo)
Best Server: Cherry Mae Vivas (FEU)
Best Receiver: Lizlee Ann Gata (Adamson)
Conference MVP: Aiza Maizo (UST)
Finals MVP: Aiza Maizo (UST)

Starting line-ups

External links
Official website

Shakey's V-League conferences
2009 in volleyball
2009 in Philippine sport